OpenAP was the first open source Linux distribution released to replace the factory firmware on a number of commercially available IEEE 802.11b wireless access points, all based on the Eumitcom WL11000SA-N board. The idea of releasing third party and open source firmware for commercially available wireless access points has been followed by a number of more recent projects, such as OpenWrt and HyperWRT.

OpenAP was released in early 2002 by Instant802 Networks, now known as Devicescape Software, complete with instructions for reprogramming the flash on any of the supported devices, full source code under the GNU General Public License, and a mailing list for discussions.

External links

http://savannah.nongnu.org/projects/openap/

Wi-Fi
Free routing software
Custom firmware